With an Identity Disc is a poem written by English poet Wilfred Owen. The poem was drafted on 23 March 1917.

The Poem

Composition
The style of the poem is a sonnet. The name of the poem stems from identity discs that British soldiers wore around their necks during the First World War. The discs were used as evidence for a soldiers death . This poem is influenced by William Shakespeare's Sonnet 104 first two lines; To me, fair friend, you never can be old, For as you were when first your eye I ey'd and John Keats' poem 'When I have Fears that I may Cease to Be'.

Writing the Poem
On the night of 14/15 of March 1917, Owen received a concussion after a fall at Le Quesnoy-en-Santerre. On the same night he was evacuated to a Military Hospital at Nesle. On the 17th of March, Owen was moved to 13th Casualty Clearing Station at Gailly. While recovering, Owen sent a letter to his younger brother Colin,

Owen sent the poem to Colin but Owen revised it six months later at Craiglockhart. The Poem was finalised in August–September 1917.

References

Poetry by Wilfred Owen
1917 poems
British poems
World War I poems